B. graveolens may refer to:

 Bulbophyllum graveolens, an orchid species
 Bursera graveolens, the palo santo, a tree species native to Central America and South America

See also